A statue of Christopher Columbus was a memorial in Washington Park (now Harriet Tubman Square) in Newark, New Jersey within the James Street Commons Historic District. It was made in Rome by Giuseppe Ciochetti and presented to the city by Newark's Italians in 1927. The statue was removed by the city (with pedestal left in place) in June 2020 to prevent its toppling in a Black Lives Matter protest.

A second statue of Columbus in Newark, also ordered removed by Mayor Ras Baraka, was subsequently re-erected in Sussex County, New Jersey.

The pedestal of the statue was removed in 2022 in preparation for the installation of A Shadow of a Face, a memorial to Harriet Tubman. The outline of the statue's plinth is inscribed on the ground as part of the new monument. As of October 2020, the statue was being stored on a vacant city lot in Newark's North Ward.

See also
 List of monuments and memorials removed during the George Floyd protests
 List of public art in Newark, New Jersey

References

Buildings and structures in Newark, New Jersey
Historic district contributing properties in Newark, New Jersey
Monuments and memorials in New Jersey
Monuments and memorials removed during the George Floyd protests
Monuments and memorials to Christopher Columbus
Outdoor sculptures in New Jersey
Public art in Newark, New Jersey
Sculptures of men in New Jersey
Statues in New Jersey
Newark, New Jersey
Statues removed in 2020